Biceratopsidae is an extinct family of redlichiid trilobites, with species of small to average size. Species of belonging to this family lived during the Toyonian stage (Olenellus-zone), 522–513 million years ago, in the former continent of Laurentia, including what are today the south-western United States and Canada. It contains the subfamilies Biceratopsinae and Bristoliinae.

Habitat 
The Biceratopsidae were probably marine bottom dweller, like all Olenellina.

References 

 
Olenelloidea
Trilobite families
Cambrian trilobites
Cambrian first appearances
Cambrian Series 2 extinctions